Yayway Cemetery (also spelt Yeway Cemetery) is a cemetery located in North Okkalapa Township, Yangon, Myanmar. The cemetery is the final resting place of many prominent Burmese.  The cemetery is maintained by the Yangon City Development Committee's environmental maintenance department. Yayway Cemetery also consists of various ethnic and religious cemeteries, including those of the Burmese Indians, Sino-Burmese (Hakka, Cantonese, Hokkien, and Yunnanese), Karen, Japanese, Baháʼís, Hindus, Christians, Muslims, Parsis, and Jews.

History
In the mid-1990s, the State Law and Order Restoration Council, the ruling junta, forcibly closed down and relocated historic cemeteries lying near the city center of Yangon. One of the biggest was Kyandaw Cemetery (in Kamayut Township), which was relocated to suburbs in 1996 to 1997, and redeveloped as the Yangon Drugs Elimination Museum. Descendants of the interred were given one month's notice to move the remains for reburial. Similarly, that year, the Nine Mile Cemetery, an ethnic Chinese cemetery was demolished and remains were relocated to Yayway Cemetery. The interred remains from these cemetery relocation projects were reburied at Yayway Cemetery, located on the outskirts of the city.

Today, Yayway Cemetery is the busiest in the Yangon area, handling the highest volume of cremations (70 to 100 per day).

Notable burials and cremations
 Ant Gyi
 Chit Maung
 Dwe
 Gita Lulin U Ko Ko
 Journal Kyaw Ma Ma Lay
 Ko Ni
 Khin Yu May
 Khun Sa
 Ma Ma Lay
 Mahn Thet San
 Min Theinkha
 Min Thway
 Nat Nwe
 Nay Win Maung
 Ni Ko Ye
 Nwam Jar Thaing
 Ohn Myint
 Paragu
 Sai Htee Saing
 Shwe Ohn
 Soe Win
 U Lwin
 Win Tin
 Ye Lwin

References

Cemeteries in Myanmar